The 2000 1. divisjon, Norway's second-tier football league, began play on 30 April 2000 and ended on 22 October 2000. The league was contested by 14 teams, and the top two teams won promotion to Tippeligaen, while the third placed played a promotion-playoff against the 12th-placed team in Tippeligaen to win promotion. Due to an expansion from 14 to 16 teams in the next season's First Division only two teams were relegated to the 2. divisjon.

Lyn and Strømsgodset won direct promotion to Tippeligaen, while Sogndal was promoted after having beaten Vålerenga in the promotion-playoff. Strindheim and Eik-Tønsberg was relegated to the 2. divisjon.

League table

Top scorers

References 

Norwegian First Division seasons
2
Norway
Norway